Benice is a municipal district (městská část) and cadastral area (katastrální území) in Prague. It is located in the south-eastern part of the city. As of 2008, there were 467 inhabitants living in Benice.

The first written record of Benice is from the 14th century. The village became part of Prague in 1974 with the last enlargement of the city.

External links 
 Praha-Benice - Official homepage

Districts of Prague